Felisberto Sebastião da Graça Amaral, more commonly known as Gilberto (born 21 September 1982), is an Angolan former professional footballer who played as a left winger or left midfielder. He played professionally for Egypt's Al Ahly, Belgian club Lierse, Cypriot club AEL Limassol, and for Benfica de Luanda in his native country. He represented the Angola national team at international level.

Club career

Al Ahly
While playing for Al Ahly in Egypt, Gilberto was well known for fitting into the team's tactic. The tactic was that Gilberto would run on the side of the pitch and then cross the ball at the end to Flavio who would score with a header. With Al Ahly, Gilberto played against many world class teams such as FC Barcelona and Roma. He helped his team to domestic success before helping them become the only team in the world to qualify to Club World Cup twice in a row.

2015 incident and retirement
On 26 July 2015, during a match of Benfica de Luanda, Gilberto was knocked out following a tackle by an opponent from Progresso do Sambizanga. He subsequently remained unconscious for about twenty minutes, before being resuscitated by medical service and immediately carried to the hospital. A doctor stated that no injuries were detected in medical tests. Shortly afterwards, he announced his retirement as a player and that he was taking an office position with Benfica de Luanda.

International career
An Achilles tendon injury made him miss the 2006 African Cup of Nations and the 2006 FIFA World Cup in Germany. He was part of the Angola national team during the 2008 African Cup of Nations in Ghana.

In the 2010 African Cup of Nations opening game against Mali on 10 January in Luanda Gilberto made assist for 1–0 lead to Flávio Amado in the first half. In the second half he scored from penalty-kick for Angola 3–0 lead and later in the game Seydou Keita penalised him for another penalty kick for Angola. Manucho scored for 4–0 but the match finished 4–4 after four consecutive goals for Mali in the last 15 minutes of the game.

Career statistics

International

Scores and results list Angola's goal tally first, score column indicates score after each Gilberto goal.

References

External links
 
 

Living people
1982 births
Footballers from Luanda
Angolan footballers
Angola international footballers
Angolan expatriate footballers
Association football midfielders
Atlético Petróleos de Luanda players
Al Ahly SC players
Lierse S.K. players
AEL Limassol players
S.L. Benfica (Luanda) players
Egyptian Premier League players
Belgian Pro League players
Cypriot First Division players
Expatriate footballers in Egypt
Expatriate footballers in Belgium
Expatriate footballers in Cyprus
2008 Africa Cup of Nations players
2010 Africa Cup of Nations players
2012 Africa Cup of Nations players
2013 Africa Cup of Nations players
Angolan expatriate sportspeople in Cyprus
Angolan expatriate sportspeople in Egypt
Angolan expatriate sportspeople in Belgium